Israel-Finland relations are diplomatic, commercial and cultural ties between Finland and Israel. Finland maintains an embassy in Tel Aviv and  Israel maintains an embassy in Helsinki. Both countries are full members of the Union for the Mediterranean.

History

The foundation for bilateral relations between Finland and Israel was laid before the establishment of the State of Israel. Finnish President Paasikivi announced de facto recognition of Israel on 11 June 1948, a month after Israel's declaration of independence. Finland officially recognized the State of Israel on 18 March  1949 and diplomatic relations were established on 14 November 1950. Finland opened its embassy in Tel Aviv in 1952 and Israel opened its embassy in Helsinki in 1956.

The first Finnish diplomatic representative to Israel was Toivo Kala, who  presented his letter of accreditation to Foreign Minister Moshe Sharett. Sharett told Kala that he admired Finland's readiness to defend its rights and its efforts to rebuild after the war.

Today, Finland and Israel have strong cultural and scientific ties, and some 10,000 Finns visit Israel every year.

Economic relations
In 2005, Finnish exports to Israel totaled 155.24 million euros and imports from Israel to Finland totaled 95.96 million euros. Israel imports Finnish machinery, telecommunications equipment, wood, paper products and chemical industry products. Israel's leading exports to Finland are telecommunications equipment and machinery, and Israeli fruits and vegetables.

In 2004, a joint Finland-Israel Technology (FIT) cooperation program was created for research and development projects in the field of ICT. The Office of the Chief Scientist in Israel and Tekes, the Finnish Funding Agency for Research and Innovation, allocated five million euros each for the funding of projects.

The Finland Israel Trade association serves as an intermediary between Finnish and Israeli companies in order to create new business contacts. It helps to organize business missions to Israel and hosts business missions from Israel.

In April 2019, Finland and Israel embarked on a project to sponsor joint programs in digital health and healthcare technology. The Israel Innovation Authority and the Helsinki Business Hub led the initiative.

Cultural ties
In 2006, an exhibition on the history of Finland's Jews from the 1830s to the 1970s opened at Beth Hatefutsoth in Tel Aviv.

Military ties
IMI Galil is said to have been partially based on Finnish Rk 62 assault rifle, and indeed the machinery used to manufacture the first Galils as well as receivers for the early samples were provided by Valmet. Tampella (through fully owned subsidiary Salgad) and Israeli Solel Boneh founded Soltam Systems in 1950 and started to license build Finnish designed artillery pieces and grenade launchers in Israel. It was seen as a win-win for two small and relatively poor countries with nascent defence. When two decades passed the two countries' profiles had grown apart. Amid negative publicity and dwindling domestic sales for Tampella, the ties between Salgad and Soltam were severed 15 August 1974.

The FDF's LV141 and LV241 radios have been contract-built by Tadiran for Danish Terma A/S. Spike anti-tank missiles were bought from German Rheinmetall, which subcontracted Rafael Advanced Defense Systems. Rafael was also involved in FDF's LITENING AT targeting pod purchase. Mastsystem International, current Cobham Mast Systems have been granted an export license to export some  telescopic masts from Finland to Israel. The process to receive export licenses to Israel has been criticized as politically unpredictable, enough for customers to lose interest. For example, a Mastsystem International spokesperson noted in October 2010 that they were denied permit from the end of 2008 to summer 2009. In the same newspaper article a researcher noted that in 2008 Finland had also denied some export permits to Sri Lanka, Brazil and Russia.

In April 2012 the FDF ordered for the Army 24 million euros worth of Orbiter II UAVs from Aeronautics Defense Systems. Their previous Swiss UAV RUAG Ranger's design was also done in Israel.
In January 2014, the FDF ordered $47 million worth of multi-spectral camouflage technology from Fibrotex Technologies.

See also
 Foreign relations of Finland
 Foreign relations of Israel
 History of the Jews in Finland
 Yad HaShmona
 SV Estelle
 Israel–European Union relations 
 Finland–Russia relations
 Finland–Turkey relations

References

External links
  Finnish Ministry of Foreign Affairs about the relation with Israel
  Finnish embassy in Tel Aviv
  Israeli embassy in Helsinki

 
Israel
Bilateral relations of Israel